Sylvain Léandri (born 7 February 1948) is a French former professional footballer who played as a defender and midfielder.

International career 
Léandri was a youth international for France.

Honours 
Nice
 Division 2: 1969–70

References

External links 
 
 

1948 births
Living people
Footballers from Nice
Association football forwards
Association football midfielders
OGC Nice players
Paris Saint-Germain F.C. players
Paris FC players
AC Ajaccio players
Gazélec Ajaccio players
Ligue 1 players
Ligue 2 players
France youth international footballers
French footballers